George Bryan Slater (born March 28, 1961) is an American political operative who has been tapped by Glenn Youngkin to serve as Virginia Secretary of Labor. A Republican, he managed Jim Gilmore's campaigns for Attorney General and Governor before serving as his Secretary of Administration from 1998 to 2001.

References

External links
Virginia Secretary of Labor

Living people
1961 births
State cabinet secretaries of Virginia
United States Department of Labor officials
Politicians from Richmond, Virginia 
Virginia Republicans
21st-century American politicians